Martin Kováč (born 3 May 1984 in Košice) is a Slovak football defender who recently played for the 1. liga club FK Bodva Moldava nad Bodvou.

External links
 at official website fkmoldava.sk

References

1984 births
Living people
Association football defenders
Slovak footballers
FC Lokomotíva Košice players
FC VSS Košice players
FC DAC 1904 Dunajská Streda players
FK Bodva Moldava nad Bodvou players
Sportspeople from Košice